Relativity Records was an American record label founded by Barry Kobrin at the site of his company, Important Record Distributors (IRD) in metro New York. Relativity released music that covers a wide variety of musical genres. When it entered into a deal with Sony Music Entertainment, it became more known for its heavy metal and hip hop releases.

History
Although it was reportedly established in 1985, there is evidence that the Relativity Records imprint began  as an in-house IRD label.

In the 1980s, Relativity Records was mostly focused on rock music, including heavy metal and punk rock. Releases in this genre were split among Relativity and its sister labels Combat and In-Effect Records. Following the recession of 1990, these labels were folded back into the main Relativity label. Also in that year, Sony Music acquired a 50% stake in the company. Around 1992, the label underwent restructuring. IRD was renamed Relativity Entertainment Distribution. In 1995, Relativity entered into limited partnership deals with two regional independent hip hop record labels, Suave Records and Ruthless Records in 1993. The company was acquired by Sony in 2007.

See also
 List of record labels

References

 
Defunct record labels of the United States
Sony Music